Hadley Irwin was the pseudonym of a writing team, consisting of Lee Hadley (10 October 1934, in Earlham, Iowa – 22 August 1995) and Annabelle Irwin  (Peterson, Iowa, 8 October 1915 – Sunday 13 September 1998, aged 82), both Iowa State English professors. Their book Abby, My Love, 1985, is considered to be the first in children's literature to deal with incest/child sexual abuse.  The pair started writing together in 1979.

Themes 
Hadley Irwin wrote so called 'problem novels' about teenagers, aimed at young adults, for example about alcoholism, racism, antisemitism, incest/child sexual abuse and suicide.  Aside from this primary theme, Irwin often portrays the elderly as human beings with their own hopes, fears, and problems.   Books are often set in Iowa, the home state of both Hadley and Irwin.  A final theme has to do with the relationships between parents and children.

According to The New York Times, the novel Abby, My Love (1985) was the first novel in children's literature to deal with incest/child sexual abuse. The main character of the book is a girl who is sexually abused by her father.

In spite of the heavy subjects, the books are written with humor, and the main theme is coming of age, and relations between people. Their historic novels are based on facts.

The book We Are Mesquakie We Are One describes the history of the Mesquakie accurately, according to expert Adeline Wanatee.

Reception 
According to The New York Times Book Review, The Lilith Summer is "a sympathetic novel of teen-age distress", "in no way a liberationist tract" and "The story is warm and the writing exemplary".

According to Publishers Weekly, Hadley Irwin's "themes are thoughtfully developed and well worth pondering", and Kim/Kimi is "a drama that Irwin spices with naturally amusing episodes".

Some of Hadley Irwin's books have been adapted for the screen. Their books sold steadily in the United States as well as in Europe and in Japan.
Abby, My Love (also Atheneum), which focuses on incest, was adapted as a CBS Schoolbreak Special in 1988.

Awards 
Hadley Irwin received several literary awards for their books:
 In 1981: an honor book designation from the Jane Addams Peace Association for We Are Mesquakie, We Are One (1980).
 In 1982: Society of Midland Authors award for Moon and Me (1981)
 In 1982: ALA Best Young Adult Book Award for What About Grandma? (1982). 
 In 1982: the Dutch Book Award  for We Are Mesquakie, We Are One (1980).
 In 1983: the Dutch Book Award  for What About Grandma? (1982).
 In 1985: ALA Best Young Adult Book Award for Abby, My Love (1985)
 In 1986: the Dutch Book Award  for I Be Somebody (1984).
 In 1986:  Children's Choice Book award from a joint committee of Children's Book Council and International Reading Association for Abby, My Love (1985)
 In 1988: the Sequoyah Intermediate Book Award for Abby, My Love (1985).

Bibliography

References

External links 

 
 Ann Irwin at LC Authorities, with 2 records (1973–1977)
 Lee Hadley at LC Authorities, no records

American writers of young adult literature
American women novelists
20th-century American novelists
Writing duos
Collective pseudonyms
People from Madison County, Iowa
People from Clay County, Iowa
20th-century American women writers
Women writers of young adult literature
Pseudonymous women writers
20th-century pseudonymous writers